Dead Men are Dangerous is a 1939 British noir crime film directed by Harold French and starring Robert Newton, Betty Lynne, John Warwick, and Peter Gawthorne. It was released in the U.S. as Dangerous Masquerade. Its plot concerns an unsuccessful writer who is wrongly accused of a murder.

Plot
Penniless and debt ridden writer Aylmer Franklyn (Robert Newton) happens upon a dead man lying under the branch of a tree, apparently killed during a violent storm. Swapping clothes and identities with the corpse seems like a way out of his troubles, and Franklyn even attends his own inquest; but little does he know the man had a criminal history and he soon finds the police on his trail.

Cast
 Robert Newton as Aylmer Franklyn
 Betty Lynne as Nina
 John Warwick as Goddard
 Peter Gawthorne as Conray
 Merle Tottenham as Gladys
 John Turnbull as Inspector Roberts
 Aubrey Mallalieu as Coroner
 Kynaston Reeves as James T. Franklyn
 Winifred Oughton as Mrs Blagden 
 Cyril Chamberlain as George Franklyn (uncredited)
 Charles Mortimer as Policeman (uncredited)
 John Salew as Tramp (uncredited)
 Anita Sharp-Bolster as Spinster Resident (uncredited)

Critical reception
In a contemporary review, The Leicester Daily Mercury found "Fast moving action, a goodly sequence of thrills, and some splendid acting by Robert Newton, characterises Dead Men are Dangerous, a film with a clever plot and a strong taste of the mysterious"; while more recently, Vintage 45 wrote, "No great acting to speak of and no real depth to the story but it’s fun to watch it all unfold. Don’t expect anything exceptional and you’ll probably like it."

References

External links

1939 films
1939 crime films
British crime films
1930s English-language films
Films directed by Harold French
British black-and-white films
1930s British films